I Was Here  is an Estonian feature film, based on a novel  by Sass Henno. The story is about a 17-year-old boy who becomes a drug dealer, the decision that draws him into turbulent events he can't control. The movie was directed by René Vilbre and written by Ilmar Raag. The film premiered on 8 July 2008 at the Karlovy Vary International Film Festival, in Estonia was released on 12 September 2008 and it became the 5th most successful Estonian film premiere since the early 1990s.

The movie was co-produced by Amrion Productions in Estonia, and Helsinki Filmi OY in Finland

Cast 

 Rasmus Kaljujärv - Rass
 Hele Kõre - Renita
 Margus Prangel - Mõssa
 Märt Avandi - Aivo
 Marilyn Jurman - Säde
 Johannes Naan - Janar
 Tambet Tuisk - Olari
 Doris Tislar - Hanna
 Triin Tenso - Kelly
 Nikolai Bentsler - Talis
 Rafael Jenokjan - Ruslan
 Jaan Rekkor - Karm tüüp 
 Sten Zupping - Turske tüüp 
 Anne Reemann - Teacher
 Marta Laan - Rass' deskmate

References

External links 
 
 Mina olin siin at Estonian Film Database

2008 films
Estonian drama films
Films based on Estonian novels
Films about drugs
2000s teen drama films
2008 drama films